The Campeonato Brasileiro Feminino Sub-20, is the official Brazilian national football tournament for U-20 women's teams. From 2019 to 2021 it was disputed as Sub-18 (under-18) category.

List of champions

Following there are all the championship editions:

Sub-18 (under-18)

Titles by club

See also
 Campeonato Brasileiro Feminino
 Campeonato Brasileiro Feminino Sub-17

References